Marinella is a 1936 French comedy film directed by Pierre Caron and starring Tino Rossi, Yvette Lebon and Jeanne Fusier-Gir.

The film's sets were designed by the art director Jean Douarinou.

Cast
 Tino Rossi as Tino Pirelli  
 Yvette Lebon as Lise  
 Jeanne Fusier-Gir as Madame Irma  
 Albert Duvaleix as Barton 
 Pierre Juvenet as Vautrat  
 Georges Flateau as Bob Grey  
 Spadolini as Le danseur 
 Marcya Capri as La speakerine  
 Julien Carette as Trombert  
 Ginette Darcy
 Cinda Glenn as Sylvia Grey 
 Raymond Cordy 
 Paul Demange 
 Philippe Derevel 
 Madeleine Gérôme
 Jany Laferrière 
 Georges Marceau 
 Edouard Rousseau 
 Marthe Sarbel

References

Bibliography 
 Philippe Rège. Encyclopedia of French Film Directors, Volume 1. Scarecrow Press, 2009.

External links 
 

1936 films
French comedy films
1936 comedy films
1930s French-language films
Films directed by Pierre Caron
French black-and-white films
1930s French films